The 1960 Tiverton by-election was a parliamentary by-election for the British House of Commons constituency of Tiverton on 16 November 1960.

Vacancy
The by-election was caused by the elevation of the sitting Conservative MP, Rt Hon. Derick Heathcoat-Amory to the House of Lords on 1 September 1960. He had been MP here since holding the seat in 1945.

Election history
Tiverton had been won by the Conservatives at every election since 1924 when they gained the seat from the Liberals. The result at the last General Election was as follows;

Candidates
The Conservatives selected 29-year-old Robin Maxwell-Hyslop. He contested the Derby North constituency at the 1959 general election. He was Personal Assistant to the director and general manager of the aero engine division of Rolls-Royce from 1954 to 1960.
Labour selected a new candidate in 35-year-old Raymond Dobson. At the last General election he was Labour candidate for Torrington.
The Liberals re-selected 42-year-old James Collier who contested the constituency in 1959. He was a local farmer, his family had farmed in the parish of Culmstock since 1600.

Main Issues and Campaign

Result

Aftermath
Maxwell-Hyslop and Collier faced each other again at the following General Election while Dobson moved to contest Bristol North East, where he came second.
The result at the 1964 general election;

Maxwell-Hyslop retained the seat until he retired at the 1992 general election.

References
 Who's Who: www.ukwhoswho.com
 By-Elections in British Politics by Cook and Ramsden

See also
 List of United Kingdom by-elections
 United Kingdom by-election records
 

Tiverton
Tiverton 1960
Tiverton by
Tiverton, Devon
1960s in Devon